The Ministry of Economic Affairs and Employment (TEM) is one of the ministries of the Finnish Government. The ministry implements industry, labor, and local development policies.

There are two ministerial portfolios located within the ministry:
 Minister of Economic Affairs 
 Minister of Employment

The ministry was formed in 2008 by merging the former Ministry of Labour (työministeriö), the former Ministry of Trade and Industry (kauppa- ja teollisuusministeriö), and parts of the Ministry of the Interior (sisäministeriö) related to local administration. The first minister was Mauri Pekkarinen. The combination was called superministeriö because it was so large and diverse. The intention of the merger was to make sure that labor policy and industrial policy, as well as others such as immigration policy and regional policy, are coordinated and don't go separate ways.

The ministry manages 15 local employment and economy offices, 15 local Centres for Economic Development, Transport and the Environment and a host of separate national agencies.

Agencies 

Government agencies:
 Energy authority
 Finnish Competition and Consumer Authority
 Finnish Patent and Registration Office
 Geological Survey of Finland
 National Emergency Supply Agency
 The Finnish Safety and Chemicals Agency (Tukes)

Companies:
 Business Finland Ltd
 Finnvera Plc
 Industry Investment Ltd
 VTT Technical Research Centre of Finland Ltd
 Finnish Minerals Group

Funds:
 Nuclear Waste Management Fund
 Security of Supply Fund
 State Guarantee Fund

See also 
 Solidium
 List of Finnish government enterprises

References

External links
 

Employment
Government of Finland